Atla recondita is a rare alpine species of saxicolous (rock-dwelling), crustose lichen in the family Verrucariaceae. Found in Sweden, it was formally described as new to science in 2015 by Sanja and Leif Tibell. The lichen has a thin olive brown-coloured thallus and ascospores with 9–15 transverse septa and 3–4 longitudinal septa. The authors note that it is not possible to distinguish this species from the similar Polyblastia by morphology alone.

References

Verrucariales
Lichen species
Lichens described in 2015
Taxa named by Leif Tibell
Lichens of Northern Europe